Joe B. O'Hagan, aka J.B. O'Hagan (1922 – 23 April 2001) was a Provisional IRA member.

An active member of the IRA, O'Hagan "almost singlehandedly carried the torch of the Irish Republican Movement in north Armagh for decades." . He joined the IRA in 1940 and participated in several IRA campaigns over the next five decades. A founder of the Provisional IRA, he served on its Army Council till imprisoned in the Republic of Ireland. On 31 October 1973 he and other IRA members including Kevin Mallon, Seamus Twomey  (Irish republican), escaped from Mountjoy Jail, Dublin.

He died in 2001 and was eulogised by Sinn Féin's Gerry Adams and Caoimhghín Ó Caoláin as "a republican legend ... Whether as soldier, prisoner, political activist, husband, father or friend, JB gave his fullest. He was an inspiration to younger generations of republicans and those of us who were privileged to know him well will mourn his passing deeply. I measc laochra na nGael a raibh sé." 

He was a relative of journalist Martin O'Hagan who was murdered the same year.

References

External links
http://www.anphoblacht.com/contents/7440
https://web.archive.org/web/20160304122602/http://republican-news.org/archive/2001/April26/29jboh.html
http://www.independent.ie/opinion/analysis/mountbatten-murder-suspects-on-leaked-list-26216333.html
http://www.rte.ie/tv/scannal/scannalprisonbreak.html
http://victorpatterson.photoshelter.com/image/I0000DoC0uhS4nrg

2001 deaths
Irish Republican Army (1922–1969) members
Irish republicans
Irish republicans imprisoned on charges of terrorism
People from County Armagh
Provisional Irish Republican Army members
1922 births